Here Lies Arthur is a young-adult novel by Philip Reeve, published by Scholastic in 2007. Set in fifth or sixth century Britain and the Anglo-Saxon invasion, it features a girl who participates in the deliberate construction of legendary King Arthur during the man's lifetime, orchestrated by a bard. Reeve calls it a back-creation: not a genuine historical novel as it is not based on actual specific events; rather it is "back-created" from the legends, giving them a "realistic" origin.

Reeve won the annual Carnegie Medal, recognising the year's best children's book published in the UK.

Scholastic published the first US edition in November 2008.

Plot summary

The novel starts with an attack by Arthur and his war-band, and the escape of Gwyna, a servant girl. She is found by Myrddin, a bard who hopes to build Arthur's reputation as a great hero so that he can unite the native British against the Saxons who have occupied the east of the country. Myrddin tells Gwyna to give Arthur Caliburn while pretending to be the Lady of the Lake. When she does that successfully, Myrddin disguises her in boy's clothes so that she can travel with the war-band as his servant.

During her travels, she meets a boy who was brought up as a girl, tricks a holy man, swims in the Roman baths of Aquae Sulis, takes part in a battle, and witnesses Arthur's brutality, piety and immorality, all the while observing her master create the fantastic stories that have made 'King Arthur' one of the most famous men in legend. After Arthur's death she creates some stories herself, conceding that the legend is more important than the mere facts.

Characters

 Gwyna/Gwyn: the narrator, a servant girl who serves Myrddin and spends much of the book disguised as a boy 
 Myrddin: her master, a Celtic bard, Arthur's adviser
 Arthur, nicknamed the Bear: the leader of a Romano-British war-band
 Gwenhwyfar: a relative of Ambrosius Aurelianus, later Arthur's wife, later likes Bedwyr
 Valerius: defender of Aquae Sulis, Gwenhwyfar's first husband
 Cei: Arthur's half-brother and a friend to Myrddin
 Bedwyr: Gwyn's friend, later Gwenhwyfar's lover, one of the best soldiers
 Medrawt: Bedwyr's older brother, a warrior
 Peredur: son of a famous warrior, raised as a girl by his widowed mother, later Gwyna's lover, childhood name Peri
 Saint Porroc: self-proclaimed holy man, leader of a group of worldly monks
 Maelwas of Dumnonia, overlord of the southern kingdoms

Reception

Carnegie judges (librarians) described Here Lies Arthur as enjoyable and thought-provoking, a "page-turner of a novel", adding that "Reeve cleverly makes the story relevant to today by examining the versions of history that are handed down to us, and the ways in which myths are created."

Beside the 2008 Carnegie Medal Here Lies Arthur was bronze runner up for the final Nestlé Smarties Book Prize, ages category 9–11 years. It made the Booktrust Teenage Prize shortlist and the Manchester Book Award longlist. in 2008.

Five years after its publication, WorldCat reports that Here Lies Arthur is Reeve's work most widely held in participating libraries.

On Goodreads, the book has a score of 3.6 out of 5.

See also

References

External links
  
 
 Carnegie Press Desk: Background on Philip Reeve and Here Lies Arthur

2007 British novels
2007 children's books
British children's novels
Children's historical novels
Modern Arthurian fiction
Carnegie Medal in Literature winning works
Novels set in sub-Roman Britain
Novels by Philip Reeve
Scholastic Corporation books